ZB or Zb may refer to:

Businesses and organisations
 Monarch Airlines (IATA code ZB)
 Zbrojovka Brno, a former Czechoslovakian state producer of small weapons and munitions
 Zentralbahn, a Swiss railway
 Zentralblatt MATH, now zbMATH, international mathematics article reviewing service

Computing
 Zettabit (Zb), a unit of information used, for example, to quantify computer memory or storage capacity
 Zettabyte (ZB), a unit of information used, for example, to quantify computer memory or storage capacity

Other uses
 MG Magnette ZB, the second iteration of the MG saloon of the 1950s
 Newstalk ZB, a national talkback station in New Zealand, whose callsign is ZB
 ZB conference, on the Z notation and B-Method, co-organized by the Z User Group and APCB
 ZB Holden Commodore an Australian version of the Opel Insignia

See also
 Example (disambiguation), (German: zum Beispiel or z. B.)